Michael Lassell (born July 15, 1947; New York City) is a professional writer and editor.

Parents: Michael Joseph Lassell (1917-2006) and Catherine Lassell (1920-2015); no siblings  
Education: Great Neck South High School (grad. 1965); Colgate University (B.A. 1969); California Institute of the Arts (MFA 1973); Yale School of Drama (MFA 1976).

Lassell has written extensively in the fields of design, travel, the arts (especially theater), and LGBT studies. His poetry, stories, essays, and reviews have appeared in newspapers, magazines, books, journals and anthologies in the U.S. and abroad, as well as numerous college and university textbooks. He has been most often anthologized for his poem, written at the beginning of the AIDS epidemic, "How to Watch Your Brother Die." His work has been translated into numerous languages, including French, Dutch, Spanish, German, Catalan, and Braille. His work behind the scenes on Broadway with Disney have been described as some of the most honest accounts of production life.

He served as features director of "Metropolitan Home" from 1992 until 2009. Prior to that, he served as managing editor of Interview and L.A. Style magazines, also as a theater critic for the Los Angeles Herald Examiner and L.A. Weekly.

Lassell currently resides in Greenwich Village, New York City.

Bibliography

The Lion King: Twenty Years on Broadway and Around the World (2017) 
Disney Aladdin: A Whole New World: The Road to Broadway and Beyond (2017)
Design 100: The Last Word on Modern Interiors (2010)
Glamour: Making It Modern (2009)
The Little Mermaid: From The Deep Blue Sea to the Great White Way (2009)
Tarzan: The Broadway Adventure (2007)
Mary Poppins: Anything Can Happen If You Let It (with Brian Sibley, 2007)
Decorate: Insider's Tips From Top Interior Designers (2005)
Celebration: The Story Of A Town (2004)
Disney on Broadway (ed., 2002)
Aida: Elton John & Tim Rice's AIDA: The Making Of The Broadway Musical (2000)
The World in Us: Lesbian and Gay Poetry of the Next Wave (with Elena Georgiou, 2001)
Certain Ecstasies (1999)
Men Seeking Men (ed., 1998)
A Flame for the Touch That Matters (1998)
Two Hearts Desire: Gay Couples on Their Love (ed., with Lawrence Schimel, 1997)
Eros in Boystown: Contemporary Gay Poems About Sex (ed.,1996)
The Name of Love: Classic Gay Love Poems (ed., 1995)
The Hard Way (1994)
Decade Dance (1990)
Poems for Lost and Un-Lost Boys (1985)

Awards
 Lambda Literary Award for Poetry - Decade Dance (1990)
 Nomination: Lambda Literary Award for Poetry - A Flame for the Touch That Matters (1998), The World in Us: Lesbian and Gay Poetry of the Next Wave (2001)
 Society of American Travel Writers Foundation Lowell Award, Gold Medal

1947 births
Living people
American male poets
American short story writers
American non-fiction writers
American essayists
Yale School of Drama alumni
Colgate University alumni
People from Great Neck, New York
Lambda Literary Award for Gay Poetry winners
American gay writers
American LGBT poets
American male essayists
American male short story writers
William A. Shine Great Neck South High School alumni
Gay poets